Street Rod is a racing video game developed by P.Z.Karen Co. Development Group and Logical Design Works, based on an original concept by Magic Partners and published by California Dreams for Amiga, Commodore 64 and DOS. Street Rod exclusively featured Hot Rods, and early American Muscle Cars, specifically those from GM, Ford, and Chrysler. In December 2012, MK Consultancy, from the Netherlands, acquired the copyright ownership of the Street Rod games and re-released Street Rod as freeware in 2014. Street Rod SE, an updated version which includes all of the vehicles from the Car Data Disk, was also released as freeware in 2014.

Overview
Street Rod was released in 1989 and takes place in the year 1963. Equipped with a garage and a small amount of cash ($750), the player buys a used car from the classifieds in a newspaper and embarks on a journey to rise through the ranks by winning races against other racers. Using money earned through races, the player can modify the car and winning enough races earns the right to challenge The King for his position.

Gameplay
The player starts off on the garage, where cars and parts may be purchased from the newspaper. Purchased parts must be installed by the player by entering the hood of or going under the car and then removing a series of screws to remove parts of the engine and transmission. Then, these parts must be re-installed in order and the bolts replaced, otherwise the car will be undrivable. To install tires, the car must be jacked up. While racing, the car will eventually run out of fuel, which the player must obtain from the gas station.

Competition to race is found by leaving the garage and going to the local diner. Races take place on either a dragstrip (drag race option) or an open country road. Wagers on the drag races can be set from "Just for kicks!" (no wager) to $10 and $50. On the road race wagers can be set from $25 to $100 and "pink slips" (the winner receives the loser's car). When the race starts, the player must wait for a signal to be given to go or else he forfeit the race.

If the player's car does not have an automatic transmission, he can either "drop their transmission" during the race if he keep accelerator pressed while shifting gears, or blow the engine if the tachometer dial is in the red zone for too much. In either case, the player would lose the bet he made and be transported back to the garage, where he have to get new parts for their car.

If the player crashes their car during the race, he can get the car fixed for a fee, or have it scrapped and receive the scrap value. However, if he gets involved in a serious crash or the car has already been repaired several times before, he is only able to receive the car's scrap value. During the road race the player would occasionally also get chased by police. If the player attempts to evade the police and keeps speeding, he will be fined $75 if caught. If the player slows down, he will be fined $20. Either instance results in the race being forfeited. If the player cannot afford to pay the fine, he will be sent to prison.

If the player does not have a car and or enough money to buy the cheapest car, the game ends.

The challenge is to beat The King in a road race. If the player wins, he get the King's car and girlfriend, and becomes the new King.

Reception
Computer Gaming World stated that "the designers of Street Rod have a lot to be proud of ... this game can be recommended for lovers of this era of Americana".

Sequels
Street Rod 2 was released in 1991. The game takes place in the year 1969.

References

External links
 Long Street Rod writeup with screenshots

Amiga games
Commodore 64 games
DOS games
Racing video games
1989 video games
Video games set in 1963
Freeware games
California Dreams (publishing label) games
Video games developed in the United States